The following is an incomplete list of recipients of the Australian Star of Courage, awarded for acts of conspicuous courage in circumstances of great peril.
Source: itsanhonour.gov.au

References

Further reading
Australian Bravery Association
The Star of Courage citations describe the deeds of:

Bravery Council Honours Lists
Hosted by the Governor General's website

Star of Courage